

Plants

Conifers

Angiosperms

Arthropods

Insects

Archosauromorphs

Newly named dinosaurs
Data courtesy of George Olshevsky's dinosaur genera list.

Newly named birds

Pterosaurs

New taxa

References

 
Paleontology
Paleontology 3